Cao Zhiyun, born in Jinhua, Zhejiang in 1961 is a Chinese linguist and dialectologist who is a professor at Beijing Language and Culture University.

Career 
He is best known for his work as the primary editor of the groundbreaking 2008 Linguistic Atlas of Chinese Dialects but has made numerous other significant contributions to Chinese dialectology, with a focus on the Southern Wu varieties in and around his native Jinhua. Despite his focus, his works exhibit an all around thorough and in-depth understanding of all Chinese dialect families and contemporary linguistics and is widely regarded in the field as one of China's leading authorities on Chinese dialectology.

See also
 Wu Chinese
 Dialectology

References

Linguists from China
Dialectologists
People from Jinhua
1961 births
Living people